Le Grand may refer to:

Places
Le Grand, California
Le Grand, Iowa

People
Le Grand Henderson, American author

Other
Le Grand, another name for Sikorsky Russky Vityaz, the first four-engine aircraft in the world built in Russia by Sikorski

See also
Legrand (disambiguation)